Mutriku may refer to:

Motrico, Gipuzkoa is a town in the coast of Guipuzcoa, Spain, its current official name is Mutriku
Motrico (horse), a race horse, twice winner of Prix de l'Arc de Triomphe in the 1930s